FK Makedonija Vranishta is a football club based in the village of Vranishta near Struga, North Macedonia. They are currently competing in the Macedonian Third League (Southwest Division)

History
The club was founded in 1975. 

Their biggest success was the playing in the Macedonian Second League in 2001–02 season.

References

External links
Club info at MacedonianFootball 
Macedonian Football Federation 

Football clubs in North Macedonia
FK
Association football clubs established in 1975
1975 establishments in the Socialist Republic of Macedonia